Saporta (Catalan: Ça Porta) may refer to:
 Antoine de Saporta (1855–1914), a French aristocrat and non-fiction writer
 Gabe Saporta (born 1979), an Uruguayan American musician and entrepreneur
 Gaston de Saporta (1823–1895), a French aristocrat, palaeobotanist and non-fiction writer
 Ishak Saporta (born 1957), a management researcher in Tel Aviv University and social-democrat activist
 Karine Saporta (born 1950), a French choreographer, dancer, photographer and short film director
 Raimundo Saporta (1926–1997), a Spanish basketball administrator